Chappaquiddick Bridge is the debut studio album by UK band Poison Girls, released in 1980.

Track listing
All tracks written by Poison Girls.

Side A
"Another Hero"
"Hole in the Wall (Thisbe's Song)"    
"Underbitch"    
"Alienation"   
Side B
"Pretty Polly"    
"Good Time (I Didn't Know Sartre Played Piano)"    
"Other"   
"Daughters and Sons"
 Hidden Track State Control - Rock 'n' Roll
Single sided flexi-disc, 7" (added at first copies without any cover) 
"Statement"

Personnel
Bernhardt Rebours - bass, synthesizer, piano
Lance D'Boyle - drums, percussion
Nil - violin
Gem Stone - vocals
Vi Subversa - vocals, guitar
Richard Famous - vocals, guitar
Technical
John Loder - engineer, recording
Gee Vaucher - cover photography

References

1980 debut albums
Poison Girls albums
Crass Records albums